The pale kangaroo mouse or Soda Spring Valley kangaroo mouse (Microdipodops pallidus) is a species of rodent in the family Heteromyidae. It is endemic to California and Nevada in the United States.

Description
Named for its pale-furred back and long hind limbs and feet, the pale kangaroo mouse is a large-headed rodent with fur-lined external cheek pouche. This species is bipedal, meaning that it generally moves around on its strong hind legs, hopping much like a kangaroo.

The pallid kangaroo mouse, also called the pale kangaroo mouse, is one of two recognized species of kangaroo mouse, and is considered to be one of the most uncommon species of nocturnal desert dwelling rodent. The coloration of the pallid kangaroo mouse is a pale cinnamon color on the dorsal side with the ventral being covered by a pale whitish colored hair coat.

Ecology

Habitat
While both the dark and the pallid kangaroo mouse species are desert dwelling, each species have unique habitat associations within the Great Desert Basin in North America where they are found. The pallid kangaroo mouse is found in central Nevada and a limited range in the eastern desert region of California. The pallid kangaroo mouse is a sand obligate species and has been known to be an indicator of the health of the sand habitats of the Great Basin Desert. Kangaroo mice are considered specialists in ecology, with regards to surviving within extreme desert environments. This allows scientists to assess the health of the ecosystem by studying in which locations the mice are located and which they avoid.

Diet
The pallid kangaroo mouse has a diet that is grain based and have been known to supplement their diet with insects where they derive most of their water needs, as they are not known to consume free water.

Behavior
The desert is an extreme environment with unpredictable food resources. The pallid kangaroo mouse has developed some behavioral adaptations as a way of utilizing food in this environment. Pale kangaroo mice will collect seeds and then cache them in specific locations. They are known to have multiple caches so as to prevent any competing species from stealing their entire food source.
In addition to their caching behaviors, kangaroo mice have other behavioral adaptation as a nocturnal desert dwelling species. One study followed the behavior of the kangaroo mice to avoid moonlight. While the reasons behind this behavior are not fully known, it is thought that it is to avoid predation, by risk of moonlight exposure.

References

Mammals of the United States
Pale Kangaroo Mouse
Mammals described in 1901
Taxonomy articles created by Polbot